2016 U.S. Open may refer to:

2016 U.S. Open (golf), a major golf tournament
2016 US Open (tennis), a grand slam tennis event
2016 Lamar Hunt U.S. Open Cup, a soccer tournament for U.S. teams